A benefice or living is a reward received in exchange for services rendered and as a retainer for future services. The Roman Empire used the Latin term  as a benefit to an individual from the Empire for services rendered.  Its use was adopted by the Western Church in the Carolingian Era as a benefit bestowed by the crown or church officials. A benefice specifically from a church is called a precaria (pl. precariae), such as a stipend, and one from a monarch or nobleman is usually called a fief. A benefice is distinct from an allod, in that an allod is property owned outright, not bestowed by a higher authority.

Catholic Church

Roman imperial origins
In ancient Rome a benefice was a gift of land (precaria) for life as a reward for services rendered, originally, to the state. The word comes from the Latin noun beneficium, meaning "benefit".

Carolingian Era 

In the 8th century, using their position as Mayor of the Palace, Charles Martel, Carloman I and Pepin II usurped a large number of church benefices for distribution to vassals, and later Carolingians continued this practice as emperors. These estates were held in return for oaths of military assistance, which greatly aided the Carolingians in consolidating and strengthening their power. Charlemagne (emperor 800–814) continued the late Roman concept of granting benefices in return for military and administrative service to his empire. Thus, the imperial structure was bound together through a series of oaths between the monarch and the recipient of land (and the resulting income) (see Fief). He ordered and administered his kingdom and later his empire through a series of published statutes called capitularies. The Capitulary of Herstal (AD 779) distinguished between his vassals who were styled casati (sing. casatus) and non-casati, that is those subjects who had received a benefice from the hand of the king and those who had not, and 

In the year 800 Pope Leo III placed the crown of Holy Roman Emperor on the head of Charlemagne.  This act caused great turmoil for future generations, who would afterward argue that the emperor thereby received his position as a benefice from the papacy. In his March 1075 Dictatus Papae, Pope Gregory VII declared that only the pope could depose an emperor, which implied that he could do so just as a lord might take a benefice away from a vassal. This declaration inflamed Holy Roman Emperor Henry IV and furthered the friction caused in the Investiture Conflict.

Catholic Church in the Middle Ages
The expanded practice continued through the Middle Ages within the European feudal system. This same customary method became adopted by the Catholic Church.

The church's revenue streams came from, amongst other things, rents and profits arising from assets gifted to the church, its endowment, given by believers, be they monarch, lord of the manor or vassal, and later also upon tithes calculated on the sale of the product of the people's personal labour in the entire parish such as cloth or shoes and the people's profits from specific forms of likewise God-given, natural increase such as crops and in livestock.

Initially the Catholic Church granted buildings, grants of land and greater and/or lesser tithes for life but the land was not alienated from the dioceses. However the Synod of Lyon of 567 annexed these grants to the churches. By the time of the Council of Mainz of 813 these grants were known as beneficia.

Holding a benefice did not necessarily imply a cure of souls although each benefice had a number of spiritual duties attached to it. For providing these duties, a priest would receive "temporalities".

Benefices were used for the worldly support of much of its pastoral clergy – clergy gaining rewards for carrying out their duties with rights to certain revenues, the "fruits of their office".  The original donor of the temporalities or his nominee, the patron and his successors in title, held the advowson (right to nominate a candidate for the post subject to the approval of the bishop or other prelate as to the candidate's sufficiency for the demands of the post).

Parish priests were charged with the spiritual and temporal care of their congregation. The community provided for the priest as necessary, later, as organisation improved, by tithe (which could be partially or wholly lost to a temporal lord or patron but relief for that oppression could be found under canon law).

Some individual institutions within the church accumulated enormous endowments and, with that, temporal power. These endowments sometimes concentrated great wealth in the "dead hand" (mortmain) of the church, so called because it endured beyond any individual's life. The church was exempt from some or all taxes. This was in contrast to feudal practice where the nobility would hold land on grant from the king in return for service, especially service in war. This meant that the church over time gained a large share of land in many feudal states and so was a cause of increasing tension between the church and the Crown.

Pluralism 
The holder of more than one benefice, later known as a pluralist, could keep the revenue to which he was entitled and pay lesser sums to deputies to carry out the corresponding duties.

By a Decree of the Lateran Council of 1215 no clerk could hold two benefices with cure of souls, and if a beneficed clerk took a second benefice with cure of souls, he vacated ipso facto his first benefice.  Dispensations, however, could be easily obtained from Rome.

The benefice system was open to abuse.  Acquisitive prelates occasionally held multiple major benefices. The holding of more than one benefice is termed pluralism (unrelated to the  political theory of the same name). An English example was Stigand, Archbishop of Canterbury (1052–72).

After the Reformation, the new denominations generally adopted systems of ecclesiastical polity that did not entail benefices and the Second Vatican Council (1962–1965) called "for the abandonment or reform of the system of benefices".

French Revolution
The French Revolution replaced France's system by the Civil Constitution of the Clergy following debates and a report headed by Louis-Simon Martineau in 1790, confiscating all endowments of the church, which was until then the highest order (premier ordre) of the Ancien Régime; instead, the state awarded a salary to the formerly endowment-dependent clergy,  and abolished canons, prebendaries and chaplains. This constitution kept the separation between the nomination (advowson) and the canonical institution (benefice/living, which conferred a jurisdiction) but the state set a fixed system of salaries and would elect the metropolitan bishops who in turn would elect the curates.

Parts of these changes remain such as the abolition of the three historic roles mentioned and the constitution is still in force in Belgium.

Church of England

The term benefice, according to the canon law, denotes an ecclesiastical office (but not always a cure of souls) in which the incumbent is required to perform certain duties or conditions of a spiritual kind (the "spiritualities") while being supported by the revenues attached to the office (the "temporalities").

The spiritualities of parochial benefices, whether rectories, vicarages or perpetual curacies, include due observation of the ordination vows and due solicitude for the moral and spiritual welfare of the parishioners.  The temporalities are the revenues of the benefice and assets such as the church properties and possessions within the parish.

By keeping this distinction in mind, the right of patronage in the case of parochial benefices ("the advowson") appears logical, being in fact the right, which was originally vested in the donor of the temporalities, to present to his bishop a clerk to be admitted, if found fit by the bishop, to the office to which those temporalities are annexed.  In other words, the gift of the glebe which can be called a rectory manor or church furlong was only ever granted subject to receiving an incorporeal hereditament (inheritable and transferable right) for the original donor.

Nomination or presentation on the part of the patron of the benefice is thus the first requisite in order that a clerk should become legally entitled to a benefice. The next requisite is that he should be admitted by the bishop as a fit person for the spiritual office to which the benefice is annexed, and the bishop is the judge of the sufficiency of the clerk to be so admitted.

Suitability of parochial clergy
Under the early constitutions of the Church of England a bishop was allowed a space of two months to inquire and inform himself of the sufficiency of every presentee, but by the 95th of the Canons of 1604 that interval was reduced to 28 days, within which the bishop must admit or reject the clerk. If the bishop rejects the clerk within that time he is liable to a duplex querela (Latin: "double complaint", the procedure in ecclesiastical law for challenging a bishop's refusal to admit a presentee to a benefice) in the ecclesiastical courts or to a quare impedit in the common law courts, and the bishop must then certify the reasons of his refusal.

In the rare cases where the patron happens to be a clergyman (a clerk in orders) and wishes to be admitted to the benefice of his own advowson, he must proceed by way of petition instead of by deed of presentation, reciting that the benefice is in his own patronage, and petitioning the bishop to examine him and admit him.

Upon the bishop having satisfied himself of the sufficiency of the clerk, he proceeded to institute him to the spiritual office to which the benefice is annexed, but before such institution could take place, the clerk had to make the declaration of assent, the Thirty-nine Articles of Religion and the Book of Common Prayer, take the oaths of allegiance and canonical obedience and make a declaration against simony.  The first was laid down by the Canons of 1603/04 and modified by the Clerical Subscription Act 1865 which also prescribed the form of the declaration against simony; the words of the oath of allegiance accorded to the form in the Promissory Oaths Act 1868. Current practice is to make a declaration of assent to the doctrine and liturgical practice of the Church of England, and take the oaths of allegiance and canonical obedience as defined by Canons of the Church of England.

The bishop, by the act of institution, commits to the presentee the cure of souls attached to the office to which the benefice is annexed. In cases where the bishop himself is patron of the benefice, no presentation or petition is required to be tendered by the clerk, but the bishop having satisfied himself of the sufficiency of the clerk, collates him to the benefice and office. A bishop need not personally institute or collate a clerk; he may issue a fiat to his vicar-general or to a special commissary for that purpose.

After the bishop or his commissary has instituted the presentee, he issues a mandate under seal, addressed to the archdeacon or some other neighbouring clergyman, authorizing him to induct the clerk into his benefice – in other words, to put him into legal possession of the temporalities, which is done by some outward form, and for the most part by delivery of the bell-rope to the presentee, who then tolls the church bell. This form of induction is required to give the clerk a legal title to his beneficium, although his admission to the office by institution is sufficient to vacate any other benefice which he may already possess.

A benefice is avoided or vacated
 by death;
 by resignation, if the bishop is willing to accept the resignation. (Before the introduction of the Church of England Pensions Board, by the Incumbents' Resignation Act 1871 (Amendment) Act 1887, any clergyman who had been an incumbent of one benefice continuously for seven years, and became incapacitated by permanent mental or bodily infirmities from fulfilling his duties, could, if the bishop thought fit, have a commission appointed to consider the fitness of his resigning; and if the commission reported in favour, he could, with the consent of the patron (or, if that is refused, with the consent of the archbishop) resign the cure of souls into the bishop's hands, and have assigned to him, out of the benefice, a retiring pension not exceeding one third of its annual value, recoverable as a debt from his successor);
 by cession, upon the clerk being instituted to another benefice or some other preferment incompatible with it;
 by deprivation and sentence of an ecclesiastical court; under the Clergy Discipline Act 1892, an incumbent who has been convicted of offences against the law of bastardy, or against whom judgment has been given in a divorce or matrimonial cause, is deprived, and on being found guilty in the consistory court of immorality or ecclesiastical offences (not in respect of doctrine or ritual), he may be deprived or suspended or declared incapable of preferment;
 by act of law in consequence of simony;
 by default of the clerk in neglecting to read publicly in the church the Book of Common Prayer, and to declare his assent thereto within two months after his induction, pursuant to an act of 1662;
 more recently, also on reaching statutory retirement age.

Pluralism in England
Dispensation, enabling a clerk to hold several ecclesiastical dignities or benefices at the same time, was transferred to the Archbishop of Canterbury by the  Ecclesiastical Licences Act 1533, certain ecclesiastical persons having been declared by a previous statute (of 1529) to be entitled to such dispensations. The system of pluralities carried with it, as a direct consequence, systematic non-residence on the part of many incumbents, and delegation of their spiritual duties in respect of their cures of souls to assistant curates. The evils attendant on this system were found to be so great that the Pluralities Act 1838 was passed to abridge the holding of benefices in plurality, requiring that no person should hold under any circumstances more than two benefices and such privilege was subject to the restriction that both benefices must be within  of each other.

By the Pluralities Act 1850 restrictions were further narrowed so that no spiritual person could hold two benefices except the churches of such benefices within  of each other by the nearest road, and the annual value of one of such benefices did not exceed £100. By this statute the term "benefice" is defined to mean "benefice with cure of souls" and no other, and therein to comprehend all parishes, perpetual curacies, donatives, endowed public chapels, parochial chapelries and chapelries or districts belonging or reputed to belong, or annexed or reputed to be annexed, to any church or chapel.

The Pluralities Acts Amendment Act 1885 superseded these, however, and enacted that by dispensation from the Archbishop of Canterbury, two benefices can be held together, the churches of which are within  of each other, and the annual value of one of which does not exceed £200.

Current usage
A benefice or living in the Church of England describes any ecclesiastical parish or group of ecclesiastical parishes under a single stipendiary minister, as well as its related historical meaning.

The term dates from the grant of benefices by bishops to clerks in holy orders as a reward for extraordinary services. The holder of a benefice owns the "freehold" of the post (the church and the parsonage house) for life.

Such a life freehold is now subject to certain constraints.  To comply with European Regulations on atypical workers, the parson's freehold is being phased out in favour of new conditions of service called "common tenure".

See also
 In commendam
 Chopchurch
 Concordat of Worms
 Statutes of Mortmain
 Cestui que
 Tithe
 Glebe

Notes

References

Bibliography

 

Ganshof, F. L. “Benefice and Vassalage in the Age of Charlemagne”. Cambridge Historical Journal 6, No. 2 (1939): 147–175.
Hollister, C. Warren, ed. Medieval Europe: A Short History. (New York: McGraw-Hill, 1994)
ODCC = Cross & Livingstone, Oxford Dictionary of the Christian Church (OUP, 1974)
Tierney, Brian. The Crisis of Church and State 1050–1300. (Englewood Cliffs, NJ: Medieval Academy of America, 1988).

Catholic Church and finance
Anglicanism
Catholic canon law of property